Dyrøya is an island in Dyrøy Municipality in Troms og Finnmark county, Norway. The  island is located between the large island of Senja and the mainland of Norway. The Dyrøysundet strait lies to the east of the island (towards the mainland) and the Tranøyfjorden lies to the north and west (towards Senja).

The island is connected to the mainland by the Dyrøy Bridge, east of the village of Brøstadbotn. The largest village area on the island is on the central part of the eastern coastline of Dyrøya, including Holm, where Dyrøy Church is located.

See also
List of islands of Norway

References

Dyrøy
Islands of Troms og Finnmark